Jerry Weiss may refer to:
 Jerry Weiss (musician)
 Jerry Weiss (artist)